If He Is Protecting Our Nation, Then Who Will Protect Big Oil, Our Children? is an album by indie rock band Of Montreal.  Originally self-released by the band as a tour-only CD, it was later released commercially with a few changes.

Track listing of commercial release
 "My, What a Strange Day With a Swede" - 4:11
 "An Ill-Treated Hiccup" - 2:23
 "Cast in the Haze (Been There Four Days)" - 2:46
 "Mimi Merlot Beatnik Version" - 0:31
 "Girl From NYC (Named Julia)" - 2:15
 "Inside a Room Full of Treasures, a Black Pygmy Horse's Head Pops Up Like a Periscope" - 2:28
 "Charlie and Freddy" - 1:31
 "There Is Nothing Wrong With Hating Rock Critics" - 4:41
 "Maple Licorice" - 0:58
 "Barely Asian at the Beefcake Horizon" - 1:13
 "Spooky Spider Chandelier" - 1:30
 "Friends of Mine" (The Zombies cover) - 2:20
 "Christmas Isn't Safe for Animals" - 3:42

Track listing of original tour-only CD
 "My, What a Strange Day With a Swede" - 4:11
 "An Ill-Treated Hiccup" - 2:25
 "Cast in the Haze (Been There Four Days)" - 3:01
 "She's My Best Friend" (Velvet Underground cover) - 3:30
 "Mimi Merlot Beatnik Version" - 0:29
 "Neru No Daisuki" - 3:25
 "Maple Licorice" - 1:01
 "Inside a Room Full of Treasures, a Black Pygmy Horse's Head Pops Up Like a Periscope" - 2:27
 "Spooky Spider Chandelier" - 1:30
 "Charlie and Freddy" - 1:32
 "Girl From NYC #64" - 2:15
 "Nickee Coco Chorus" - 1:21
 "Friends of Mine" (The Zombies cover) - 2:28
 "Christmas Isn't Safe for Animals" - 3:42

Of Montreal albums
2003 compilation albums